Zürich Affoltern railway station is a railway station in the Affoltern quarter of the Swiss city of Zürich. The station is located on the Wettingen–Effretikon railway line (Furttal line).

The station is not to be confused with Affoltern am Albis railway station, which is located in Affoltern am Albis (Säuliamt), canton of Zürich.

Infrastructure 
In 2010, the station was rebuilt with the introduction of a convenience store and parking for 130 bicycles. The store is open 365 days a year from dawn to dusk and is part of the Migrolino chain owned the Migros company. The former station building (Alter Bahnhof) is situated to the west of the current location, on the opposite side of Zehntenhausstrasse.

Service 
The station is served by line S6 of the Zürich S-Bahn, along with bus routes 37, 61 and 62 of the Verkehrsbetriebe Zürich (VBZ). Some trains of the peak-hour service S21 also call at Zürich Affoltern station. On weekends, there is a nighttime S-Bahn service (SN6) offered by ZVV.

Summary of all S-Bahn services:

 Zürich S-Bahn:
 Nighttime S-Bahn (only during weekends):

Gallery

References

External links 

Affoltern